Mehrdad Jama'ati (born October 7, 1989) is an Iranian footballer who most recently played for Sepidrood Rasht S.C. in the Iran Pro League as well as Iran national football team.

Club career
Jama'ati signed his first professional contract in 2009 and has played his entire career for Foolad.

 Assist Goals

International career
He made his debut against Kuwait in the 2015 AFC Asian Cup qualification match on 3 March 2014.

Honours
Foolad
Iran Pro League: 2013–14

References

External links
Profile at Persianleague

1989 births
Living people
Foolad FC players
Iranian footballers
Persian Gulf Pro League players
People from Izeh
Association football defenders
Sepidrood Rasht players
Iran international footballers
Sportspeople from Khuzestan province